Daniel Nissan (born 1966) is an Israeli-American Internet entrepreneur who had a leading role in the development of VoIP, e-commerce and marketing automation. Since 1993 Nissan has been a senior executive, co-founder and CEO with three companies: VocalTec, who patented the first Voice over IP audio transceiver and released the first VoiP software (1995), NetGrocer, the first online, nationwide ecommerce supermarket (1996), and StructuredWeb, the first marketing automation software for local and channel marketing (1999).

Career
Nissan joined VocalTec in 1993, as VP Product and Marketing, and conceptualized the development of its breakthrough product, Internet Phone. During his time at VocalTec he helped develop and launch a line of IP based communication software for live voice, video, screen collaboration and online music distribution. In 1995, while working at VocalTec, he developed its e-commerce site that enabled online purchase of the Internet Phone. In 1996 Nissan also establish a paid banner advertising agreement with Yahoo! and The New York Times, as well as the first affiliate marketing program with web sites, working alongside Jeff Pulver.

In 1996 Nissan co-founded NetGrocer and was its CEO until 1999. He currently serves as the President and CEO of StructuredWeb, a SaaS marketing automation company he founded in 1999.

See also
 VocalTec

References

External links
VocalTec
NetGrocer
StructuredWeb
Highbeam Business - Interview

American technology chief executives
1966 births
Living people